Fabian Plak (born 23 July 1997) is a Dutch volleyball player for Estonian club Saaremaa and the Dutch national team.

He participated at the 2017 Men's European Volleyball Championship.

Personal life
Plak was born in Tuitjenhorn, son of Surinamese kickboxing world champion Kenneth and Dutch volleyball player Karin. He has an older sister, Celeste, who also plays volleyball. Plak went to the Johan Cruyff College in Nijmegen.

References

1997 births
Living people
Dutch men's volleyball players
People from Schagen
Sportspeople from North Holland
Dutch expatriate sportspeople in Estonia
Expatriate volleyball players in Estonia
Dutch sportspeople of Surinamese descent